McConnachie is a surname. Notable people with the surname include:

Billy McConnachie (born 1990), Scottish rugby league player
Brett William McConnachie (born 1985), Canadian hockey player
Brian McConnachie (born 1942), American actor and writer
William McConnachie (1848–1932), Scottish businessman and politician

See also
McConnochie